Paratragon jadoti is a species of beetle in the family Cerambycidae. It was described by Pierre Téocchi and Jérôme Sudre in 2002.

References

Pachystolini
Beetles described in 2002